Kim Yang-gon (24 April 1942 – 29 December 2015) was a North Korean politician and a senior official of the ruling Workers' Party of Korea.

Early career
Kim Yang-gon started his political career as a vice-director of the party's International Liaison Department in 1986, and during this time he also oversaw relations with Japan as head of the DPRK-Japan Friendship Association. He was a recipient of the top Order of Kim Il-sung in 1995. He was promoted to director in 1997 and visited China multiple times during his tenure. In 2005 he also received a position as "councilor" to the National Defence Commission.

Promotion
Several months after the death of Rim Tong-ok, Kim Yang-gon, considered a confidant to Kim Jong-il, was appointed to replace him as director of the United Front Department of the Workers' Party in March 2007. His first assignment as head of relations with South Korea was a visit to Seoul in November to discuss rapprochement measures with Unification Minister Lee Jae-jeong. At the Party Conference held in September 2010, Kim was also appointed secretary for united front and South Korea policies of the Secretariat and alternate member of the Politburo.

Kim Yang-gon kept his position under Kim Jong-un, and he was awarded the newly created Order of Kim Jong-il in July 2012. He visited South Korea again in October 2014 to attend the closing ceremony of the 2014 Asian Games with Hwang Pyong-so and Choe Ryong-hae, and in late August 2015 to negotiate a deal to halt military provocations around the Demilitarized Zone.

Death
In December 2015, North Korea's news agency reported that Kim Yang-gon died in a car accident. He was lying in state in Sojang Club in Pyongyang and honored in a state funeral.

He was replaced in January 2016 by Kim Yong-chol.

Kim Yang-gon's funeral committee was composed of:

 Kim Jong-un
 Kim Yong-nam
 Hwang Pyong-so
 Pak Pong-ju
 Kim Ki-nam
 Choe Ryong-hae
 Choe Tae-bok
 Pak Yong-sik
 Ri Yong-gil
 Yang Hyong-sop
 Kang Sok-ju
 Ri Yong-mu
 O Kuk-ryol
 Kim Won-hong
 Kwak Pom-gi
 O Su-yong
 Kim Pyong-hae
 Choe Pu-il
 Ro Tu-chol
 Jo Yon-jun
 Im Chol-ung
 Kim Tok-hun
 Kim Yong-jin
 Ri Mu-yong
 Ri Chol-man
 Kim Yong-dae
 Ryu Mi-yong
 Ri Il-hwan
 Ri Man-gon
 Kim Man-song
 Choe Sang-gon
 Ri Yong-rae
 Kim Jong-im
 Kim Jung-hyop
 Hong In-bom
 Kim Kyong-ok
 Choe Hwi
 Ri Pyong-chol
 Kim Yong-su
 Jon Il-chun
 Jong Myong-hak
 Kim Hi-taek
 Jon Kyong-nam
 So Hong-chan
 No Kwang-chol
 Rim Gwang-il
 Jo Nam-jin
 Ryom Chol-song
 Jo Kyong-chol
 Yun Tong-hyon
 Kim Hyong-ryong
 Kim Yong-chol
 O Kum-chol
 Tae Jong-su
 Kim Su-gil
 Pak Tae-song
 Kim Nung-o
 Jon Sung-hun
 Pak Yong-ho
 Pak Tae-dok
 Kim Jae-ryong
 Pak Jong-nam
 Ri Sang-won
 Kang Yang-mo
 Rim Kyong-man
 Kim Wan-su
 Won Tong-yon
 Ri Jong-hyok
 Kim Jin-guk
 Pak Jin-sik

References

|-

Members of the Supreme People's Assembly
1942 births
2015 deaths
Road incident deaths in North Korea
People from South Pyongan
20th-century North Korean people
21st-century North Korean people
Alternate members of the 6th Politburo of the Workers' Party of Korea
Members of the 6th Secretariat of the Workers' Party of Korea
Members of the 6th Central Committee of the Workers' Party of Korea